Alyaksandr Leonidovich Chayka (born 27 January 1976) is a Belarusian professional football coach and a former player.

Playing career
He made his professional debut in the Belarusian Premier League in 1992 for FC Dnepr Mogilev.

From 2004 to 2005 Chayka played for Tobol Kostanay in Kazakhstan.

References

1976 births
Living people
Belarusian footballers
Belarus international footballers
FC Spartak Vladikavkaz players
PFC Krylia Sovetov Samara players
FC Rostov players
FC Dynamo Saint Petersburg players
FC Tobol players
Russian Premier League players
Expatriate footballers in Kazakhstan
Belarusian expatriate sportspeople in Kazakhstan
FC Dnepr Mogilev players
Belarusian expatriate footballers
Expatriate footballers in Russia
Association football midfielders